Josephus Gerhardus Rulof (February 20, 1898 – November 3, 1952) was a Dutch author who was known as a self-proclaimed psychic and trance medium or spirit medium. He wrote about thirty books about life, death, and the hereafter.

Rulof claimed to be the greatest medium ever, and that nobody would ever surpass him. The next great medium would be the "Direct Voice Apparatus" (DVA), a technical device that would enable people to communicate directly with the spirit world. The DVA would be based on another device to make all diseases disappear.

He claimed he was under the control of two guides: master Alcar and master Zelanus.

Tenets of his teachings

There is no death

The most important point in the teachings of Jozef Rulof is that there is no death. A human dies when the silver cord, which connects the physical body with the spiritual body, breaks. The spirit then leaves its body and goes back to the world of the unconscious awaiting a new birth, or it goes to a sphere of darkness or a sphere of light, depending on the spiritual attunement of that person.

Suicide

Rulof believed that each human has a certain time to live. When someone commits suicide, they only lose day-consciousness. The silver cord does not break and the suicide remains in the material body. They then experience the body's rotting. According to Rulof, this pain cannot be compared with any torture on earth. When the body is rotted completely and the skeleton becomes visible, the person walks in an empty world and only sees and hears themselves. When the actual time of death has come, the spirit goes back to the world of the unconscious, or it goes to one of the spheres. For example, when someone commits suicide at the age of 35, and that person had to become 85 years old, they must dwell in an empty world for 50 years. The book The Cycle of the Soul tells the story of Lantos and what he experiences when he commits suicide.

Cremation

Jozef Rulof rejects cremation. It would cause a shock and an unbearable suffering for the dead. Persons attuned to a sphere of light will not suffer much, but persons attuned to a sphere of darkness will burn spiritually. Persons going back to the world of the unconscious awaiting a new birth will not feel anything. In the book A View into the Hereafter, there is a story about someone who committed suicide and what he experiences when he is being cremated.

Karma and 'Cause and Effect'

A person creates karma when someone commits murder. In a next life, the murderer is born as a woman and gives birth to the one who was murdered. This way, the murderer gets a chance to make it up. Cause and Effect means what you do to another, you do to yourself. According to Rulof, this Cause and Effect can be seen primarily in marriage. One could say that if the man wears the pants, the woman has to make good to him and if the woman wears the pants, the man has to make good to her.

Body, spirit and soul

The human spirit consists of a tenuous, spiritual substance and looks the same as the physical body. The soul is a piece of pure All-Source, a propelling force which forces man to evolution. The spirit is connected with the physical body by means of a silver cord, which works like a rubber band. Thoughts are sent via this cord through the solar plexus to the brain, where they are intercepted and analyzed further. The brain acts only as some kind of resistor, not as a memory.

Twin souls

A twin soul is what is called the One True Love. Every person has a twin soul, because the All-Source represents fatherhood as well as motherhood. Man and woman form one unity. Our twin soul is the cell with which we had sexual intercourse for the first time on the Moon. Two cells united and secreted another cell. This cell divided to form two other cells. These two new cells will unite just as the parent cells did. The chance a person marries his twin soul is very small: we are already too long on Earth because of our karma and Cause and Effect. But we have certainly met our twin soul in previous lives and it is nonetheless possible that we meet our twin soul during our current life, even without knowing it. They could be our son or daughter, a friend, or awaiting a new birth in the world of the unconscious.

Theory of evolution

Man did not descend from ape but ape descended from man. The first living cells on Earth were human cells. When these cells died, new life emerged from their rot: animal cells. This process repeated over and over again: new cells emerged from the rot of these animal cells and so forth. Through evolution, man has indeed been a fishlike and apelike being, but never an animal apelike being. Man has always been ahead of animals and plants in terms of evolution.

Astrology

Astrology will never become a science. Planets can have an influence on the physical body but they cannot influence someone's personality.

Cosmic Grades

There are seven Cosmic Grades. The Moon is the first Cosmic Grade, Mars the second and the Earth the third. The fourth, fifth, sixth and seventh Cosmic Grades all lie in their own universe and consist of seven planets and seven suns.

There are 15 planets in our universe which contain human life. We started our divine cycle on the Moon and, via six other planets, arrived on Mars. Then again, via six other planets, we finally arrived on Earth. Each of these planets pushed the development of the human body a bit further. For example, on the Moon, we reached only a fishlike phase but on Mars, we were already like an ape. This means that there are no other planets in our universe which contain human life which is as developed as on Earth.

When our earthly cycle has come to an end, we go further as a spirit in the spheres. When we have fully taken possession of the seventh sphere of light, we are attracted by the Mental Areas and will soon begin our life on the first planet of the fourth Cosmic Grade.

When we have taken full possession of the seventh planet of the seventh Cosmic Grade, we are in The All and our divine cycle has come to an end.

Jesus Christ

 Jesus was not born by a miracle of the Holy Spirit, he was born just like everybody else.
 Jesus was not betrayed by Judas Iscariot. Judas hoped that his master would show his divine powers. He was surprised that Jesus did not do anything when he was arrested. Because he saw that he had made a mistake, he committed suicide.
 Jesus did not die for our sins, he was simply murdered.
 Jesus was the first person who reached The All.

Cosmic Art
Jozef Rulof made several hundred paintings. All of his paintings have a symbolic, spiritual meaning. His primary subjects were spiritual flowers and spirits. He never painted earthly things like cows and houses. He painted on canvas, wood and plates. In the years 1947 and 1948, he gave public painting demonstrations in the Palace theater in Rotterdam and the building Diligentia in The Hague.

During a trip to the United States, Rulof gave a remarkable painting demonstration. He made a large painting on the wall of the dining room of the rocking steamship Veendam while standing on a chair. The painting was finished in less than an hour and a half. During another public demonstration, he amazed the audience by suddenly turning the half-finished painting upside down and continuing his work.

One of his paintings, donated by some Dutch to thank Sweden for its help at the end of the Second World War, hung for a while in the Swedish Parliament.

Public Speakings

Jozef Rulof gave hundreds of lectures. He also held contact evenings during which the audience could ask questions about his books and related subjects, such as abortion, Adolf Hitler, astrology, the appendix, blindness, blood transfusion, capital punishment, cause and effect, cremation, euthanasia, free will, homosexuality, karma, marriage, miscarriages, mongolism, overpopulation, psychopathy, space travel, suicide, the tonsils, transsexuality, Tutankhamun, UFOs, vegetarianism, vivisection and the Second World War.

During most of his lectures and during several contact evenings, Rulof was purportedly taken over by master Alcar or master Zelanus. It is a fact that there was a notable difference in tone between the lectures and contact evenings given by himself and those given by his masters.

The last 57 of these lectures and some contact evenings were recorded on a wire recorder and are available in book form.

Controversies and Criticism

Racism

In his book The Origin of the Universe, Rulof wrote that there are 7 physical grades of life on Earth and that we start our earthly cycle as a jungle inhabitant and gradually evolve, through many, many lives, to the white race. Some people accuse Rulof of racism because of this theory. They think that Rulof claimed that the white race is superior to the other races. This reasoning is, however, disputed on the following basis:

 Throughout his books, he never calls for the discrimination of black people.
 "White race" doesn't refer to the color of the skin. Africans, Chinese and Indians also belong to the white race or sixth and seventh degree.
 Because of his theory, we all have to go through all degrees/races. This makes it rather difficult to discriminate against another.

The Centre for equal opportunities and opposition to racism in Belgium even went to court to try to forbid the publication of Rulof's books. However, in 2007, the court of Dendermonde (Belgium) judged that the books of Rulof do not encourage race discrimination.

Going to the Moon

Rulof claimed that it is impossible to go to the Moon with a rocket because of unknown forces in the universe. In his book The Origin of the Universe, he stated that the rocket would "melt apart". In Questions and Answers, Part V, he wrote that it is wrong to think that the rocket would be attracted by the Moon: the planet would push the rocket away in the first place. According to him, it would be possible to go far away from the Earth, but when one goes too far, one has to accept his death.

Trivia
 The Society Spiritual-Science Foundation The Age of Christ administers the complete works of Jozef Rulof. It was set up for this purpose in 1946 by Rulof himself.
 In 1952, a few months before his death, Rulof published a series of articles in the magazine Heemsteedse Nieuwsblad, which would later become the Europese Heraut under the pseudonym Marja Radjany.

Bibliography

 A View into the Hereafter
 The bridge to eternal life
 The cycle of the soul
 The Origin of the Universe
 Through the Grebbeline to Eternal Life
 Mental Diseases as seen from the Side Beyond
 Between Life and Death
 My revelations to the peoples of the earth
 Spiritual Gifts
 Masks and Man
 Jeus of mother Crisje, Part I
 Jeus of mother Crisje, Part II
 Jeus of mother Crisje, Part III
 The Cosmology of Jozef Rulof, Part I
 The Cosmology of Jozef Rulof, Part II
 The Cosmology of Jozef Rulof, Part III
 The Cosmology of Jozef Rulof, Part IV
 The Cosmology of Jozef Rulof, Part V
 Questions and Answers, Part I
 Questions and Answers, Part II
 Questions and Answers, Part III
 Questions and Answers, Part IV
 Questions and Answers, Part V
 Questions and Answers, Part VI
 57 Lectures, Part I
 57 Lectures, Part II
 57 Lectures, Part III

The books Questions and Answers contain the transcripts of contact evenings which were recorded on a wire recorder. Jozef Rulof edited part I to make it more appealing for the reader.

References

External links
 The official Jozef Rulof website
 http://www.jeus.info/
 Short interview with Jozef Rulof in Dutch

1898 births
1952 deaths
People from Montferland
Dutch spiritual writers
Dutch psychics
Spiritual mediums